James “Jim” Paul Sean Bryson is a Canadian singer-songwriter. Briefly a founding member of the band Punchbuggy, he moved to a musical life under his own name with the release of his debut album, The Occasionals, in 2000.

A member of singer-songwriter Kathleen Edwards's touring band, Bryson has also toured and recorded with many other artists, including Howe Gelb, Lynn Miles, Sarah Harmer, The Weakerthans, Hilotrons and The Tragically Hip.

Bryson has toured Canada and the United Kingdom extensively. He has played the South by Southwest festival and his music has been in rotation on CBC Radio 3.

He is the subject of Kathleen Edwards's song "I Make the Dough, You Get the Glory", which appears on her album Asking for Flowers.

It was announced in January 2010 that Bryson was recording songs with The Weakerthans for his next album. That album, The Falcon Lake Incident, was released October 19, 2010. He also produced Tanya Davis' 2010 album Clocks and Hearts Keep Going.

In June 2012, he launched a "Catch and Release" series with singer-songwriter Jeremy Fisher, in which the two musicians collaborated on a project to write and release a song in a single day. The first song in the series, "The Age of Asparagus", was released on June 7, 2012. He has also collaborated with Ottawa musician Chris Page; under the band name Owl Mountain Radar, this duo contributed a cover of The Nils' song "Daylight" to the 2011 compilation album Have Not Been the Same – Vol. 1: Too Cool to Live, Too Smart to Die.

Since 2014, Bryson has run the Fixed Hinge recording studio, which was constructed alongside his home. Here, he has done a great deal of production work for other artists.

His newest EP, Tired of Waiting, was released on September 14, 2018.

Discography
 The Occasionals (2000)
 The North Side Benches (2003)
 Where the Bungalows Roam (2007)
 Live at the First Baptist Church (2008)
 The Falcon Lake Incident (2010)
 Somewhere We Will Find Our Place (2016)
 Tired of Waiting (2018)

Contributions
 Kathleen Edwards, Failer (2002)
 Kate Maki, Confusion Unlimited (2003)
 Lynn Miles, Unravel (2003)
 Kate Maki, The Sun Will Find Us (2004)
 Sarah Harmer, All of Our Names (2004)
 Kathleen Edwards, Back to Me (2005)
 Howe Gelb, 'Sno Angel Like You (2006)
 Tanya Davis, Clocks and Hearts Keep Going (2010)
 Michael Feuerstack, Singer Songer (2014)
 Oh Susanna, Namedropper (2014)
 Kalle Mattson, Avalanche (2015)
 Ken Yates, Huntsville (2016)
 Larissa Tandy, The Grip (2017)
 Oh Susanna, A Girl in Teen City (2017)
 Kathleen Edwards, Total Freedom (2020)

References

External links
 Jim Bryson
 Kelp Records

Canadian singer-songwriters
Musicians from Ottawa
Living people
1971 births
20th-century Canadian male singers
Canadian indie rock musicians
Canadian folk rock musicians
20th-century Canadian guitarists
21st-century Canadian guitarists
Canadian record producers
Canadian male guitarists
21st-century Canadian male singers
Canadian male singer-songwriters